Education for Chemical Engineers is a peer-reviewed academic journal published quarterly by Elsevier on behalf of the Institution of Chemical Engineers. The journal's scope covers all aspects of chemical engineering education. The journal was established in 2006 and publishes educational research papers, teaching and learning notes, and resource reviews. It is an official Journal of the European Federation of Chemical Engineering.

Abstracting and indexing 
The journal is abstracted and indexed in EBSCOHost, Gale Database of Publications & Broadcast Media, and Scopus.

External links 
 

Chemical industry in the United Kingdom
Chemical engineering journals
Chemical education journals
Engineering education in the United Kingdom
Publications established in 2006
Elsevier academic journals
Quarterly journals
English-language journals
Institution of Chemical Engineers
Academic journals associated with learned and professional societies of the United Kingdom
2006 establishments in England